The William Greenwood House, at 190 S. 1st West in Beaver, Utah, was built in 1878.  It was listed on the National Register of Historic Places in 1982.

It is two stories high, which is unusual for a black rock (basalt) building in Beaver.  However it was originally constructed as a lean-to.

It was built for, and possibly by, William Greenwood, who was born in Hopinstal, England.  It is similar to other buildings by stonemason Thomas Frazer but is probably not a work of his.

References

		
National Register of Historic Places in Beaver County, Utah
Houses completed in 1878